Endtime Ministries is an American Pentecostal Christian organization. It defines itself as a teacher of biblical prophesy founded and headed by minister Irvin Baxter Jr.  The organization is based in Plano, Texas.
 
It focuses on explaining world events from its view of the Bible, with an emphasis on prophecy and exposition of eschatological theories. Some of these predictions include a new world war that will kill up to two billion people, and the identification of Britain, the reunified Holy Roman Empire, Russia and Germany with the "four beasts" of the Book of Daniel.

See also
 Summary of Christian eschatological differences

References

External links
 

Pentecostalism in the United States
Religious organizations based in the United States
Christian eschatology